Wrestling competitions at the 2015 Pan American Games in Toronto were held from July 15 to 18 at the Hershey Centre (Mississauga Sports Centre) in Mississauga. Due to naming rights the arena will be known as the latter for the duration of the games.  The competition is split into two disciplines, Freestyle and Greco-Roman which were further divided into different weight categories. Men competed in both disciplines whereas women only took part in the freestyle events, with 18 gold medals awarded. Wrestling has been contested at every Pan American Games.

Competition schedule

The following is the competition schedule for the wrestling competitions:

Medal table

Medalists

Men's events
Freestyle

Greco-Roman

Women's events
Freestyle

Participating nations
A total of 22 countries have qualified athletes. The number of athletes a nation has entered is in parentheses beside the name of the country.

Qualification

A total of 150 wrestlers can qualify to compete at the games. The winner of each weight category 2014 South American Games, 2014 Pan American Championships and 2014 Central American and Caribbean Games will qualify for the Games. The top five in the 2015 Pan American Championship also qualify. The host country (Canada) is guaranteed a spot in each event, but its athletes must compete in both the 2014 and 2015 Pan American Championship. A further six wildcards (four men and two women) will be awarded to nations without any qualified athlete but took part in the qualification tournaments.

See also
Wrestling at the 2016 Summer Olympics

References

 
Events at the 2015 Pan American Games
Pan American Games
2015
International wrestling competitions hosted by Canada